Shahrdari Urmia Volleyball Club (Bashgah-e Valibal-e Shiherdari Arumih) is an Iranian professional volleyball team based in Urmia, Iran. They compete in the Iranian Volleyball Super League.

Sponsorship names
Moghavemat (1996–1999)
Moghavemat Esteghlal (1999–2000)
Moghavemat (2000–2001)
Shahid Bakeri (2001–2002)
Samansoo (2002–2003)
Pegah (2003–2008)
Foolad (2008–2009)
Heyat Volleyball (2009–2011)
Shahrdari (2011–present)

Team rosters

(2021-2022) 
  Alireza Behboudi (capitan)
  Saeed Mostafavand
  Rahman Davoudi
  Saber Kazemi
  javid esmaeel zade
  Ahad Rezaei
  Arman Salehi
  Adel Gholami
  Ghasem Karkhaneh
  Abdolreza Alizadeh
  amir reza sarlak
  Ashkan Derakhshan
  Saeed Aghajani
  Amirhossein Hemmati

Notable former players
  Krasimir Stefanov
  Saeid Marouf
  Yasser Portuondo
  Milad Ebadipour
  Alireza Nadi
  Slobodan Kovač
  Valerio Vermiglio
  Nikolay Nikolov

Honors
Iranian Super League
Runners-up (3): 2005, 2015, 2021
Third place (7): 2004, 2008, 2009, 2012, 2014, 2016, 2017

References

External links
 Shahrdari Urmia Fan's Portal
 Cheering of spectators Shahrdari Urmia in Ghadir Area
 Rosters

Iranian volleyball clubs
Sport in Urmia